New International Track & Field, known in Japan as , is a sports video game by Konami for the Nintendo DS. Developed by Sumo Digital, it is the latest game in Konami's Track and Field series.

Overview
New International Track & Field features single-player career and training modes in addition to Wi-Fi multi-player between 2 and 4 players, a character-based minigame challenge mode and a worldwide player ranking system. The original Track and Field game is also available to play.

The gameplay of New International Track & Field differs from the traditional button mashing and joystick-wiggling gameplay of the original games in that players use the motion of the stylus to set a rhythm for their character. In addition, the game also features uses for the DS' dual screens and players can shout encouragement for their character via the microphone to give them an extra boost. The louder they shout, the bigger the boost.

New International Track & Field used to feature an online community at their website. Players would be able to link their games to their website accounts and participate in online global scoreboards, teams, and tournaments. The site also used to feature forums for discussion about the game.

Sports
24 events are featured in the game.
100 Metre Sprint
Long Jump
110 Metre Hurdles
Skeet Shooting
Weightlifting
400 Metre Distance
Steeplechase
Archery
Javelin
Cycling
Triple Jump
Hammer
Discus
Shot Put
Breaststroke
100 Metre Backstroke
High Jump
High dive
Double trap
Springboard
Pole vault
Rowing
Horizontal bar

Characters
New International Track & Field features a roster of 18 super deformed characters designed by comic company UDON. The roster includes a mix of original characters and established Konami characters. Additional costumes and accessories are also unlockable. Characters include:

Original characters
Yoko
Kiko
Kang
Helga
Dirk
Claudia
Ashley
Oolong (possibly an aged version of the protagonist of Yie Ar Kung-Fu)
The Referee
Ming Ming

Konami characters
Sparkster from Rocket Knight Adventures
Pyramid Head from Silent Hill 2 and Silent Hill: Homecoming
Evil Rose from Rumble Roses
Frogger
Simon Belmont from Castlevania
Pentarou from Parodius
Solid Snake from Metal Gear
Power Pro-kun from the Power Pros series

Reception

The game received "average" reviews according to the review aggregation website Metacritic.  In Japan, Famitsu gave it a score of one six, one seven, one five, and one seven, for a total of 25 out of 40.

The game was awarded as the Best Sports Game for the Nintendo DS by IGN in their 2008 video game awards. IGN also made it a nominee for Best Local Multiplayer Game for the Nintendo DS.

References

External links

UDON Entertainment

2008 video games
Olympic video games
Nintendo DS games
Nintendo DS-only games
Nintendo Wi-Fi Connection games
Konami games
Crossover video games
Video games scored by Allister Brimble
Video games scored by John Broomhall
Video games developed in the United Kingdom
Athletics video games
Sumo Digital games